Buffalo Presbyterian Church and Cemeteries is a historic Presbyterian church and cemeteries located at 1333 Carthage Street in Sanford, Lee County, North Carolina.  It was built in 1879, and is a two-story, gable-fronted, Gothic Revival style frame building.  The front facade features lancet-arched double-leaf entries, lancet-arched windows, and a three-stage projecting entry tower with a flared, pyramidal roof and finial. Associated with the church is the manse built in 1926.  It is a two-story, hip-roofed frame dwelling with Colonial Revival detailing. Also on the property are the original church cemetery, a cemetery for African-American congregants, the Matthews family plot, and the main cemetery. It is the oldest Presbyterian Church in Lee County, Sanford, North Carolina. This is an active congregation of the Presbyterian Church USA.

It was listed on the National Register of Historic Places in 1999.

References

External links
Church website

Cemeteries in North Carolina
Presbyterian churches in North Carolina
Churches on the National Register of Historic Places in North Carolina
Gothic Revival church buildings in North Carolina
Colonial Revival architecture in North Carolina
Churches completed in 1879
19th-century Presbyterian church buildings in the United States
Buildings and structures in Lee County, North Carolina
National Register of Historic Places in Lee County, North Carolina